Elliot Goldenthal scored the 1997 movie The Butcher Boy; the soundtrack was released in 1998. It marks another collaboration with director Neil Jordan.

Track listing 
 The Francie Brady Show (2:23) - Elliot Goldenthal
 Blood of the Apache (2:34) - Elliot Goldenthal
 Tune for Da (2:07) - Elliot Goldenthal
 Mack the Knife (2:37) - Performed by Santo & Johnny
 Pig Fur Elise (3:30) - Elliot Goldenthal
 No One Knows (2:34) - Performed by Dion and the Belmonts
 My Ole Pal (1:20) - Elliot Goldenthal
 Blessed Mothers Carnival Night (3:37) - Elliot Goldenthal
 Funeral and Ave Maria (1:53) - Elliot Goldenthal
 Oh Mein Papa (2:44) - Performed by Eddie Calvert
 Francie Brady Not our Lady (1:20) - Elliot Goldenthal
 Tune for Da (2:17) - Elliot Goldenthal
 Nut Rocker (1:58) - Performed by B Bumble & the Stingers
 Sweet Heart of Jesus (3:28) - Performed by Regina Nathan
 The Butcher Boy (4:06) - Performed by Sinéad O'Connor

Crew/Credit 
 Music Composed by Elliot Goldenthal (except 4, 6, 8, 10, 13, 14 & 15)
 Music Produced by Matthias Gohl and Elliot Goldenthal
 Orchestrated by Elliot Goldenthal and Robert Elhai
 Conducted by Edward Shearmur
 Recorded by James P. Nichols and Steve McLaughlin
 Mixed by Steve McLaughlin

References

External links 
 
 Page for score on Goldenthals page

Elliot Goldenthal soundtracks
1998 soundtrack albums
Drama film soundtracks
Comedy film soundtracks